PlayMakers Laboratory (PML), formerly Barrel of Monkeys, is an arts-education and theater ensemble based in Chicago that works in under-served Chicago Public Schools. Founded by Erica Halverson and Halena Kays in 1997, PML consists of actors, musicians and teaching-artists that run in-school residency writing workshops, an after-school program and a weekly public performance, That's Weird, Grandma. The company works with elementary students in writing workshops, later adapting the students' original works to the stage.

History 
Barrel of Monkeys was founded by Halverson and Kays shortly after their graduation from Northwestern University, where both were involved in Griffin's Tale. Beginning with one Albany Park school, Halverson and Kays expanded their creative writing workshops to "40 public schools, mostly underfunded, on the South and West sides." After the six-week residency, in which the students transition from group writing to individual writing, Halverson and Kays would then organize performances of the students' work to take place at the schools.

Barrel of Monkeys changed its name to PlayMakers Laboratory in 2019 due to concerns over the word "monkey".

That's Weird, Grandma  
Barrel of Monkeys also runs a public performance, That's Weird, Grandma, which consists of a rotating selection of the company's favorite children-authored plays. That's Weird, Grandma is performed in the Neo Futurarium, well known as the home of the Neo-Futurists, an experimental Chicago Theater company.

Partnering Schools 
For the 2009-2010 school year, Barrel of Monkeys worked with a dozen Chicago elementary schools, as well as a Loyola Park after-school program.

Avondale Elementary
Columbia Explorers Academy
Thomas Chalmers Elementary School
Dewey Academy

Arthur Dixon Elementary
Kohn Elementary
 New Field Primary School
Little Village Academy

New Sullivan Elementary
Paderewski Elementary
Stockton Elementary
Trumbull

Company 
The company of Barrel of Monkeys consisted of 

Michelle Alba
Christina Anthony
Mikala Bierma
Molly Brennan
Brennan Buhl
Marla Caceres
Lacy Katherine Campbell
Desiree Castro
Kurt Chiang
Carly Ciarrocchi
Brandon Cloyd
Erick Deshaun Dorris
Amanda Farrar
Maggie Fullilove-Nugent
Ricardo Gamboa
Sarah Garner
Emjoy Gavino
Samantha Gleisten
Sarah Goeden
Alex Goodrich

Michael Govier
Laura Grey
Erica Halverson
Ricky Harris
Halena Kays
Oona Kersey Hatton
Luke Hatton
Mary Winn Heider
Gretchen Helmreich
Jennifer Johnson
Halena Kays
Elizabeth Levy
Michael Mahler
Tom Malinowski
Philip Markle
Marika Mashburn
Laura McKenzie
Matthew Miller
Meredith Ibey Milliron
Tai Palmgren
Caleb Probst

Mike Przygoda
Geoff Rice
Joseph Schüpbach
Alan Schmuckler
Tim Simeone
Tim Soszko
Collin Souter
Jason Sperling
Kate Staiger
Bradford Stevens
Mari Stratton
Katie Suib
Zeke Sulkes
Jeff Trainor
Mike Tutaj
Dixie Uffelman
Rani Waterman
Lindsey Noel Whiting
Curtis Williams
Donnell Williams
Rachel Wilson

References

External links
PML Homepage
Search Engine for stories written by CPS students

Theatre companies in Chicago